DD Malayalam (Malayalam: ഡി.ഡി മലയാളം), formerly known as DD4, is a Malayalam language television channel operated by India's national broadcaster Doordarshan. The name DD4 was changed to DD Malayalam after 1999. It is one of the 11 Indian regional language channels operated by Doordarshan. DD Malayalam broadcasts from Kudappanakunnu, Thiruvananthapuram, Kerala.

The channel broadcasts through satellite in the name DD Malayalam and through terrestrial in the name DD Keralam. The channel has its main studio in Thiruvananthapuram and an auxiliary studio in Kochi. In terrestrial mode, DD Malayalam is available to 99.2% of the population of Kerala. The satellite broadcast was started in 1994.

History

Though television made its entry in India on 15 September 1959, it took a quarter of a century to speak the language of most literate state of India - Kerala.
The television broadcast in Malayalam -the language of Kerala - under the legacy of Doordarshan was formally launched by the then Chief Minister of Kerala K. Karunakaran on 1 January 1985 at Tagore Centenary Hall, Thiruvananthapuram, the capital city of Kerala.

The first ever television programme in Malayalam was a children's play entitled Oru Koottam Urumbukal-ഒരു കൂട്ടം ഉറുമ്പുകൾ (A Group of Ants) presented by Rangaprabhath Children's Theatre, Venjarammoodu, Kerala under the leadership of Kochunarayana Pillai. The play was written by legendary writer and academician in Malayalam Drama, G. Sankara Pillai. This first ever television programme in Malayalam was directed and produced by A. Anwar, one of the legendary TV Directors and Producers in Malayalam. Oru Koottam Urumbukal was aired at 6:30PM on 2 January 1985. The duration of this children's play was 15 minutes.

Initially there was a broadcast in Malayalam for just 70 minutes daily from 6:30PM to 7:40PM. The first ever news bulletin Malayalam (വാർത്തകൾ) was aired live at 7:30PM on 2 January 1985. This live bulletin was produced by T. Chamiyar and presented by G. R. Kannan. The text and visual contents were edited by Baiju Chandran, A. Anwar and P. K. Mohanan.

There were a score of programmes in a week specifically targeted to special audience as well as general public. Among them the most popular were Vaarthakal-വാർത്തകൾ (News in Malayalam), Chithrageetham-ചിത്രഗീതം (Malayalam Movie Songs), Malayala Chalachithram-മലയാള ചലച്ചിത്രം (Movie in Malayalam), Poomottukal-പൂമൊട്ടുകൾ (Children's Prograamme), Arogyavedi-ആരോഗ്യ വേദി (Health Magazine), Sindooram-സിന്ദൂരം (Women's Magazine), Padavukal-പടവുകൾ (Development Program), Kalikkalam-കളിക്കളം (Sports Magazine), Yuvadarshanam-യുവദർശനം (Youth Magazine) and Rainbow (English Magazine).

The premier band of producers in Malayalam Television comprise T. Chamiyar, G. Sajan, C. K. Thomas, John Samuel, S. Venu, Baiju Chandran, M. A. Dilip, A. Anwar, R. Shyamaprasad, P. K. Mohanan, G. Jayakumar and T. N. Latha Mony.

The first ever tele-serial in Malayalam was a joint production of Doordarshan and UNICEF entitled Oru Poo Viriyunnu-ഒരു പൂ വിരിയുന്നു (A Flower Blossoms) which went on air in 1990. The serial was written and directed by Eravi Gopalan, A. Anwar and P. K. Mohanan.

There were many classic productions in Malayalam television was born under the banner of Doordarshan - the Public Service Broadcaster of India. Among them the following are the most astonishing productions still persist its dominance in the small screen: Venalinte Ozhivu-വേനലിൻ്റെ ഒഴിവ് (Telefilm, Story-Madhavikutty, Directed by Shyamaprasad), Peruvazhiyile Kariyilakal- പെരുവഴിയിലെ കരിയിലകൾ (Telefilm, Directed by Shyamaprasad) Blood-stained Allies of the Yore (Documentary, Directed by Baiju Chandran) Uyarthezhunelpu-ഉയർത്തെഴുനേൽപ്പ്‌ (Telefilm, Directed by Shyamaprasad), Viswa Vikhyaathamaaya Mookku-വിശ്വവിഖ്യാതമായ മൂക്ക് (Drama, Story-Vaikom Muhammad Basheer, Directed by Shyamaprasad), Snehathinte Mullukal-സ്നേഹത്തിന്റെ മുള്ളുകൾ (Telefilm, Story- N. Mohanan, Directed by A. Anwar), Ragging - Crime & Punishment-റാഗിങ്: കുറ്റവും ശിക്ഷയും (Documentary, Directed by A.Anwar)'Ithente Mannu, Ithente Thaalam'-ഇതെൻറെ മണ്ണ്, ഇതെൻറെ താളം (Musical Feature, Directed by A.Anwar), Hamlet of Mountain Monarch-വരയാടുകളുടെ ലോകം (Documentary, Directed by A.Anwar), Golden Dream-സുവർണ്ണ സ്വപ്നം (Children's Programme, Directed by A. Anwar), Prathiknjaa-പ്രതിജ്ഞ (Telefilm, Story- P. Kesavadev, Directed by A.Anwar), Madhuram Madhuram-മധുരം, മധുരം (Patriotic Song, Written by Rafeeq Ahamed, Directed by A. Anwar) and Sooraj ke Pahale (Patriotic Song, Written by K. J. Singh, directed by A. Anwar).

While private channels are set their target to gather more commercial earnings than any other parameters of social development Doordarshan had relentlessly shown its social commitment for human development. DD Malayalam is no exception in this regard.

As part of public broadcaster Prasar Bharati’s nationwide strategy to wind up stations operating on the obsolete technology, Doordarshan shut down 11 analogue transmitting stations in Kerala.

Programs
DD Malayalam has entertainment serials, infotainment programmes, news and current affairs, social programmes and film programmes as its major content. DD Malayalam news Varthakal from its inception in 1985 was popular among the viewers for its crisp and 'to-the-point' presentation. 'Varthakal' speaks the 'best Malayalam' among the Malayalam TV Channels.

Upcoming serials

Ithal @ 2:00pm
Kudamulla @ 2:30pm
Ashadeepam @ 3:00pm
Kattathe kilikkoodu @ 3:30pm
Meghamalhar @ 4:00pm
Mazhayethum munpe @ 4:30pm
Mounam sammatham @ 8:00pm
Sahadarmini @8:30pm
Nirakoottu @ 9:00pm

List of programmes broadcast on DD Malayalam

Thavalam serial by Sunil Krishnan, Thiruvathira Tele Film Makers, Cast - Ashokan, Ratheena V. Raju
Kunjayyappan 
Mandan Kunju
Koodaram
Oru Kudayum Kunjupengalum 
Nilavariyunnu 
Pattolaponnu         
Indulekha
Punnaykka Vikasana Corporation
Pulari 
Draupadi 
Balyakal smaranakal
Manikyan
Jwalayayi (2000)
Ditective Anand
Manasi
Snehaseema
Valayam
Sadasivante Kumbasaram 
Snehatheeram
Rachiamma (2004-Telefilm)
Veendum Jwalayayi (2006)
Suryodayam (2006)
Sagaram 
Mothiram (2006-Telefilm)
Narmadi Pudava (2007)
Aparichitha (2008)
Angadipaattu
Alakal
Chandrodayam
Purappadu
Marmaram
Sasneham
Anuyathra
Shyamambaram
Nizhalattam
Thalolam
Yathra
Sthree oru punyam
Pranayam
Moonnumughamullakannadi
Chathurangam
Anantham
Agneyam
Marubhoomiyil oru pookalam
Agnishalabham
Ishtam
Thoovalsparsham (2015)
Manjuthirum munpe
Eeran Nilavu
Vazhvemayam (2015-2016)
Ganga
Avalariyathe
Pakida pakida pambaram
Manassammatham Thannatte (Telefilm)
Yudham (Telefilm)
Oru Manushyan (Telefilm)
Sreeparvathiyude Paadham (Telefilm)
Makal (Telefilm)
Gagarajayogam
kurumthottikkumvatham
Shesham Kazhchayil
Thyagam (Telefilm)
Kunjikkoonan
Charulatha
Radhamithram
Thapasya
Inakkampinakkam
Amma
Niramala
Magam
Gandharvayamam
Nadodikalyanam
Deepanaalangalkkuchuttum
Neelamala 
Gopika 
Padavukal
Hamsageetham
om nama shivaya                                                 
shaktimaan                                                             
sankda mojak jay hanuman  
ORITHAL (tele film)

Non fictional shows

Bold and beautiful 
Beat the floor 
Foot print 4Gen
Kilivathil
Sargasangamam
Krishidarshan
Sutharya keralam
Megha Ragam
En Swaram
Sallapam
Sangeethika
Chayakoottu
Kasavutheeram
Paithrukam
Ruchi Malayalam
Cinema Weekly
Chithrageetham
Cinemax
Chembai Music Festival
Kathakali
Movie mix the most wanted
Sahayi
Crispy Bytes
DD Thriller
DD Music Plus
Veettuvishesham
Koottukari
Rhythm of cookery 
Haritha vidyalayam
Mayilpeeli
Thiranottam
Smrithilayam
Arogyabharatham
Ayur rekha
Samoohyapadam 
Rangoli

Legacy shows 
 Oru Poo Viriyunnu (meaning: A Flower Blossoms), a public interest TV serial with 87% viewers' participation. Aired during late 1980s, in 13 weekly episodes. It is the first ever full-fledged story based serial in Malayalam.
 Kairalivilasam Ladge, a satirical series aired in the early 1990s in 13 weekly episodes. The serial starred M. S. Thripunithura and Nedumudi Venu.
 Giant Robo (tokusatsu), a Japanese TV series of the 1960s was aired as Giant Robot during 1990-91 in weekly episodes.

See also
 List of programs broadcast by DD National
 All India Radio
 Ministry of Information and Broadcasting
 DD Direct Plus
 List of South Asian television channels by country
 Media in Chennai

References

External links
 Doordarshan Official Internet site
 Doordarshan news site
 An article at PFC

Malayalam-language television channels
Doordarshan
Foreign television channels broadcasting in the United Kingdom
Television channels and stations established in 1985
Direct broadcast satellite services
Indian direct broadcast satellite services
1985 establishments in Kerala
Television stations in Thiruvananthapuram